Channel 7  or TV7 may refer to:

Television networks, channels and stations
Algeria
TV7 (Algerian TV channel)
 Argentina
Channel 7 (Argentina), a government-owned Argentine TV station
Channel 7 – Bahía Blanca, an Argentine TV station in Buenos Aires province
Channel 7 – Mendoza, an Argentine TV station in Mendoza province
Channel 7 – Santiago del Estero, an Argentine TV station in Santiago del Estero province
 Australia
Seven Network or Channel 7, an Australian television network
HSV (TV station), a television station in Melbourne, Australia, part of the Seven Network
 Belize
Tropical Vision Limited, a Belize news channel
 Bolivia
Bolivia TV, formerly known as Canal 7, a government-owned Bolivian TV station
 Bulgaria
TV7 (Bulgarian TV channel)
 Chile
Televisión Nacional de Chile, a public television network in Chile broadcasting on Channel 7 in Santiago de Chile
 Ecuador
Ecuador TV, a ecuadorian free-to-air television channel 
 France
TV7 Bordeaux, a television channel in Bordeaux, France
 India
 IBN-7, a Hindi television news channel that became News18 India
 Indonesia
Trans7, an Indonesian television network formerly known as TV7
 Israel
Arutz Sheva, an Israeli media network
 Japan
TV Tokyo, a Japanese television station, virtual channel 7
 Mexico
 Azteca 7, a Mexican television channel, owned by TV Azteca
XHIMT-TV, commonly known as Canal 7, the flagship television station of Azteca 7 in Mexico City, Mexico
 Moldova
 TV8 (Moldova), a mixed Romanian/Russian-language television station, formerly known as TV7
 Nigeria
 Channel 7 (formally GNTV), broadcasting to ex-pats in the UK on the Freeview Vision TV Network
 Panama
 Oye TV Canal 7, a Panamanian free-to-air television channel
 Peru
 TV Perú, a government-owned Peruvian TV network broadcasting on Channel 7 in Lima, Peru
 Philippines
DZBB-TV, commonly known as Channel 7, the flagship television station of GMA Network in Manila, Philippines
 Sweden
TV7 (Sweden), a Swedish television channel
Sjuan (The Seven), formerly TV4 Plus, Swedish television channel
 Thailand
Channel 7 (Thailand), a television station in Thailand
 Tunisia
Tunisie 7, a Tunisian television channel commonly known as TV7
 Turkey
Kanal 7 (Channel 7), a Turkish channel
 United Kingdom
Estuary TV, an independent local station in Lincolnshire, England, formerly known as Channel 7
 Uruguay
Channel 7 (Punta del Este, Uruguay), a repeater station of Channel 10
 Vietnam
HTV7 (Channel 7), an Ho Chi Minh City Television broadcaster
Quoc Hoi TV, a Vietnam Parliament Television broadcaster
Danang TV1, a Danang Radio and Television broadcaster
TN2 (Thai Nguyen), QTV3 (Quang Ninh), TBK (Bac Kan), PTV (Phu Tho)

Other uses
Channel 7 (musician), the musician previously known as 7 Aurelius
Kanaal 7/Channel 7, a Namibian radio station

See also

 Circle 7 logo, logo used by various US TV stations

Lists of channels 7s
 Channel 7 branded TV stations in the United States
For virtual digital channels
 Channel 7 virtual TV stations in Canada
 Channel 7 virtual TV stations in Mexico
 Channel 7 virtual TV stations in the United States
For VHF frequencies covering 174-180 MHz:
 Channel 7 TV stations in Canada
 Channel 7 TV stations in Mexico
 Channel 7 digital TV stations in the United States
 Channel 7 low-power TV stations in the United States

Distinguish
 network seven (disambiguation), including 7 network
 Channel (disambiguation)
 7 (disambiguation)

07